RhoH (Ras homolog gene family, member H) is a small (~21 kDa) signaling G protein (more specifically a GTPase), and is a member of the Rac subfamily of the family Rho family of GTPases. It is encoded by the gene RHOH.

Gene
Expression of a chimeric transcript of LAZ3 and this gene has been reported as a result of the translocation t(3;4) in non-Hodgkin's lymphomas. Unlike most other small G proteins which are expressed ubiquitously, this gene is transcribed only in hemopoietic cells.

Interactions 

RhoH has been shown to interact with ARHGDIA.

References

Further reading